Destino is a Disney animated short film.

It may also refer to:

 Destino (1963 TV series), a Mexican TV series
 Destino (1990 TV series), a Mexican TV series
 Destino (2012 TV series), a Brazilian TV series
 Destino (2013 TV series), a Mexican TV series
 Destino (Rey Ruiz album), 1996
 Destino, a 2001 album by Barrio Boyzz
 Destino, a weekly Spanish magazine (1937-1980)

See also 
 Ediciones Destino, a Spanish Publisher.
 VLF Destino, a proposed automobile from American car company VLF Automotive
 
 Destiny (disambiguation)